This is a list of agricultural organizations.

International 
 4-H
 FAO
 International Institute of Agriculture (defunct)

European
 COPA-COGECA
 Conseil Européen des Jeunes Agriculteurs

Belgium
 Boerenbond
 Fédération wallonne de l'agriculture

Brazil
 Instituto Agronômico de Campinas

Ireland
 Irish Farmers' Association

Switzerland
 Union suisse des paysans (Schweizer Bauernverband / Unione Svizzera dei Contadini)

United Kingdom
 National Farmers' Union of England and Wales
 National Farmers' Union of Scotland
 Ulster Farmers' Union

United States 
 American Farm Bureau Federation
 American Poultry Association
 National FFA Organization (Future Farmers of America)
 Institute of Food and Agricultural Sciences
 The National Grange of the Order of Patrons of Husbandry (The Grange)
 National Farmers Union

New Zealand 
 Animal Health Board
 Federated Farmers
 Ministry of Agriculture and Forestry

References

 
Organizations
Agricultural